Chrysocercops vaticae is a moth of the family Gracillariidae. It is known from Negeri Sembilan, Malaysia.

The wingspan is 5.7–6.5 mm.

The larvae feed on Vatica bella. They mine the leaves of their host plant. The mine starts as a linear gallery occurring on the upper surface of the leaves. It broadens into a blotch along the margin of the leaves. In mature condition, the blotchy part is contracted upward to make a narrow fold. The cocoon, made in a furrow on the wall of the case, is boat-shaped, ochre-whitish, and usually provided with four minute bubbles on the surface.

References

Chrysocercops
Moths described in 1992